Russell Howard Gillow (born September 2, 1939 in Hespeler, Ontario) is a retired professional ice hockey player who played 109 games in the World Hockey Association with the Los Angeles Sharks and San Diego Mariners. As a 32-year-old rookie in the 1972–73 WHA season, Gillow was 2nd to Cleveland's Gerry Cheevers in lowest goals against average and helped the Los Angeles Sharks to a 3rd-place finish and playoff berth.

Gillow was an emergency backup goalie for the Philadelphia Flyers on February 1, 1972, against the California Golden Seals.

External links

1939 births
Living people
Calgary Stampeders (ASHL) players
Canadian expatriate ice hockey players in the United States
Canadian ice hockey goaltenders
Des Moines Oak Leafs players
Edmonton Flyers (WHL) players
Greensboro Generals (SHL) players
Ice hockey people from Ontario
Knoxville Knights players
Los Angeles Blades (WHL) players
Los Angeles Sharks players
Milwaukee Falcons players
Oklahoma City Blazers (1965–1977) players
San Diego Mariners players
Seattle Totems (WHL) players
Sportspeople from Cambridge, Ontario
Syracuse Blazers players
Western International Hockey League players